Linguistic Knowledge Builder (LKB) is a free and open source grammar engineering environment for creating grammars and lexicons of natural languages. Any unification-based grammar can be implemented, but LKB is typically used for grammars with typed feature structures such as HPSG. LKB is free software under the MIT license.

It is implemented in Common Lisp, and constitutes one core component of the DELPH-IN collaboration.

External links
 DELPH-IN LKB wiki

Natural language processing
Common Lisp (programming language) software
Free software programmed in Lisp